Manfred Kaufmann (born 6 March 1953) is a Brazilian sailor. He competed in the Flying Dutchman event at the 1980 Summer Olympics.

References

External links
 

1953 births
Living people
Brazilian male sailors (sport)
Olympic sailors of Brazil
Sailors at the 1980 Summer Olympics – Flying Dutchman
Sportspeople from São Paulo